Following is a list of Ministers of National Education of Turkey.

References 
 List of Ministers of National Education at official website

Ministers of National Education
National Education
Ministry of National Education (Turkey)